Nordgermersleben is a village and a former municipality in the Börde district in Saxony-Anhalt, Germany. Since 1 January 2010, it is part of the municipality Hohe Börde. The municipality encompassed the villages of Tundersleben and Brumby, both located on the Bundesstraße 1 highway running from Braunschweig to Magdeburg.

Former municipalities in Saxony-Anhalt
Hohe Börde